Anna Andreeva may refer to:

 Anna Andreyeva (1915–1997), Soviet shot put athlete
 Anna Andreeva (artist) (1917–2009), Russian textile designer